Georg Grothe   (1822 – 5 May 1876) was a Danish composer.

See also
List of Danish composers

References
This article was initially translated from the Danish Wikipedia.

Male composers
1822 births
1876 deaths
19th-century Danish composers
19th-century male musicians